Wildlands, also known as Wildlands Adventure Zoo Emmen, is a zoo in Emmen, the Netherlands. It opened in March 2016, replacing the Emmen Zoo. It was built at a cost of 200 million euros. Upon its reorganisation the zoo increased in size and animal exhibit space but  reduced its collection from 300 to about 100 species. 

Wildlands is an adventure theme park with four main areas: Jungola, Serenga, Nortica and Animazia.

 
Jungola is jungle-themed and displays butterflies, tropical birds, large reptiles (such as Chinese alligators and pythons), ring-tailed lemurs, lar gibbons, small-clawed otters and Asian elephants. Serenga is the African savanna section and is home to species such as lion, Grant's zebras, Rothschild's giraffes, white rhinoceros and hamadryas baboons, but also Australian red-necked wallabies. Nortica is aimed at cold oceans and is home to polar bear, Californian sea lion, South American fur seal and Humboldt penguin. The final main section, Animazia, is a large indoor playground, but also home to an aquarium with species such as corals, green sea turtles and tropical fish.

List of attractions

List of animals

Wildlands Adventure Zoo Emmen has at least 80 types of animals, as of 2018.

References

External links 

 

Animal theme parks
Zoos in the Netherlands
Tourist attractions in Drenthe
 Buildings and structures in Emmen, Netherlands